App, Apps or APP may refer to:

Computing
 Application software 
 Mobile app, software designed to run on smartphones and other mobile devices
 Web application or web app, software designed to run inside a web browser
 Adjusted Peak Performance, a metric to measure computing performance in 64-bit processors and above
 Application Portability Profile, NIST standards and specifications for the Open System Environment 
 Atom Publishing Protocol, simple HTTP-based protocol for creating and updating web resources

Education
 Advanced Placement Program, a program offering college-level curriculum and examinations to high school students
 Appalachian State University, a university in Boone, North Carolina, US
 Appalachian State Mountaineers, the university's athletic program
 Assessing Pupils' Progress, an assessment methodology used in schools in England and Wales

Entertainment and media
 APP (film), a 2013 Dutch film that utilizes second screen technology
 Apps (film), a 2021 anthology horror fantasy film
 Asbury Park Press, a newspaper of Monmouth County, New Jersey, US
Associated Press of Pakistan, news agency of Pakistan
 Archive of Public Protests, a collective of photographers and writers and their work documenting protests in Poland

Medicine
 Acute-phase protein, a class of proteins whose concentration changes in response to inflammation
 Advanced practice provider, or mid-level practitioner, a class of healthcare providers
 Amyloid-beta precursor protein, a protein whose fragments are associated with Alzheimer's disease and other neurological disorders

Organizations
 African Prisons Project, a UK-based NGO
 Alberta Provincial Police, a Canadian police force from 1917 to 1932
 American Principles Project, a libertarian and conservative political think tank
 Asia-Pacific Partnership, an international environmental protection alliance
 Asia Pulp & Paper, a pulp and paper company based in Jakarta, Indonesia
 Associated Press of Pakistan, a national news agency of Pakistan
 Association of Pickleball Professionals
 Association of Professional Piercers, an international organization for body piercing

Politics
 All People's Party (disambiguation), various political parties
  or People's Progressive Alliance, a party in Mauritania
 Animal Protection Party, United Kingdom
 Australian Protectionist Party
 Austrian People's Party
 Aggrupation of Parties for Prosperity, a local Philippine party
 Alliance for the Homeland, a Romanian party
 American Principles Project, a libertarian conservative think-tank
 Reason Party (Poland) (or Anticlerical Progress Party)

People
 App (surname)
 Apps (surname)

Train stations
 Appleby railway station, England (by GBR code)
 Appleton, Wisconsin, United States (by Amtrak station code)

Other uses
 Atactic polypropylene, a hot-melt adhesive
 Authorized push payment fraud (APP fraud), fraudulent diversion of funds
 App, a slang term for "appetizer"

See also
 .app (disambiguation)